Cowboy Classics: Playing Favorites II is the twenty-fourth album by American singer-songwriter Michael Martin Murphey. It is Murphey's follow-up to his 2001 compilation Playing Favorites and contains rerecorded versions of many of his cowboy songs. Murphey's attraction to the cowboy's way of life is an attempt to preserve his own cultural heritage, breathing new life into classics like "I Ride an Old Paint", "Red River Valley", and "Yellow Rose of Texas". Among the highlights of the album is a stately six-minute version of "Streets of Laredo", arranged for fiddle and piano. In the liner notes, Murphey includes a short note concerning each of the song's origins.

Track listing
 "I Ride An Old Paint" (Traditional) – 3:36
 "Whoopie Ti-Ti-Yo" – 2:26
 "The Old Chisholm Trail" – 4:39
 "Strawberry Roan" – 4:15
 "Red River Valley" – 5:41
 "Little Joe the Wrangler" (Thorp) – 4:10
 "The Colorado Trail" – 3:42
 "Tying Knots In the Devils Tail" – 3:09
 "When the Work's All Done This Fall" – 4:15
 "The Yellow Rose of Texas" (Traditional) – 2:50
 "Utah Carroll" – 3:45
 "The Bard of Armagh" / "Streets of Laredo" (Traditional) – 6:58
 "I Ride An Old Paint" (reprise) (Traditional) – 1:48

Credits
Music
 Michael Martin Murphey – vocals, acoustic guitar
 Ryan Murphey – acoustic guitar, nylon strings, producer
 Pat Flynn – acoustic guitar, nylon strings
 Chris Leuzinger – acoustic & electric guitars, nylon strings
 Jonathan Yudkin – mandolin, fiddle
 David Hoffner – piano
 Joey Miskulin – accordion
 Paul Sadler – hammered dulcimer
 Craig Nelson – upright bass
 Matt Pierson – upright bass
 Bobby Blazier – drums
 Daniel Marvel – drums

Production
 Keith Compton – engineer
 Michael Page – art direction
 John Sheppard – photography
 William Matthews – cover painting, watercolor art

References

External links
 Michael Martin Murphey's Official Website

2002 albums
Michael Martin Murphey albums
Western music (North America) albums
Sequel albums